Independent Artists was a British production company of the 1950s and 1960s. It specialised in making second features.

The company was strongest from 1958-63 when Julian Wintle ran it with Leslie Parkyn out of Beaconsfield Film Studios.

Their films  Waltz of the Toreadors (1962) and Tiger Bay (1959) were BAFTA nominated and BAFTA winning; while This Sporting Life (1963) was Oscar nominated and BAFTA winning.

Filmography
The Dark Man (1951)
The Stranger in Between (1952) aka Hunted - directed by Charles Crichton
Death Goes to School (1953)
Bachelor of Hearts (1958)
Tiger Bay (1959)
Breakout (1959)
Rebound (1959) aka Violent Moment
Deadly Record (1959)
Chance Meeting (1959) aka Blind Date - directed by Joseph Losey
The White Trap (1959)
Devil's Bait (1959)
Never Let Go (1960)  -directed by John Guillermin with Richard Todd, Peter Sellers
The Big Day (1960)
October Moth (1960)
The Malpas Mystery (1960)
Linda (1960) - directed by Don Sharp with Carol White
Snowball (1960) - with Denis Waterman
The Professionals (1960)  -directed by Don Sharp
The River of Life (1960) (documentary short)
Sea Sanctuary (1960) (documentary short)
Seven Keys (1961) - directed by Pat Jackson
Very Important Person (1961)
House of Mystery (1961)
The Man in the Back Seat (1961)
Echo of Barbara (1961)
Waltz of the Toreadors (1962) - directed by John Guillermin with Peter Sellers
Night of the Eagle (1962) aka Burn, Witch, Burn
Crooks Anonymous (1962) - directed by Ken Annakin with Leslie Phillips and Julie Christie
Play It Cool (1962) - directed by Michael Winner with Billy Fury
Our National Heritage: The Living Pattern (1962) (documentary short)
The Fast Lady (1963) - directed by Ken Annakin with Stanley Baxter and Julie Christie
This Sporting Life (1963) - directed by Lindsay Anderson with Richard Harris
The Human Jungle (1963–1964) (TV series)
Unearthly Stranger (1963) 
Bitter Harvest (1963) - with Janet Munro
Father Came Too! (1964)
Strictly for the Birds (1964)

References

External links
Independent Artists at IMDb

Defunct film and television production companies of the United Kingdom